The Municipality of Boissevain – Morton is a rural municipality (RM) in the Westman Region of the Canadian province of Manitoba.

History

The RM was incorporated on January 1, 2015 via the amalgamation of the RM of Morton and the Town of Boissevain. It was formed as a requirement of The Municipal Amalgamations Act, which required that municipalities with a population less than 1,000 amalgamate with one or more neighbouring municipalities by 2015. The Government of Manitoba initiated these amalgamations in order for municipalities to meet the 1997 minimum population requirement of 1,000 to incorporate a municipality.

Demographics 

Attractions 
The International Peace Garden is located on the southern boundary of the RM, the Canada–United States border opposite Rolette County, North Dakota. Much of Turtle Mountain Provincial Park lies in the southwest corner of the RM.

See also
 International Peace Garden Border Crossing

External links
Official website

References 

2015 establishments in Manitoba
Manitoba municipal amalgamations, 2015
Populated places established in 2015
Rural municipalities in Manitoba